Anton von Maron (January 8, 1733 – March 3, 1808) was an Austrian painter, active in Rome.

Von Maron was born in Vienna, but moved at a young age to Rome. There, he studied under Anton Raphael Mengs, and became an accomplished portraitist. He married a sister of Mengs, Therese Mengs, who was a painter in her own right. He lived the rest of his life in Rome, and died there in 1808.

References

External links

18th-century Austrian painters
18th-century Austrian male artists
Austrian male painters
19th-century Austrian painters
Austrian untitled nobility
Austrian expatriates in Italy
Artists from Vienna
1733 births
1808 deaths
19th-century Austrian male artists